Nijpels is a Dutch surname. Notable people with the surname include:
 Ed Nijpels (born 1950), Dutch politician and non-profit director
 GertJan Nijpels (1951–2021), Dutch vorstand and politician
 (born 1947), Dutch politician

Dutch-language surnames